Mohammad Reza Pahlavi (26 October 1919 – 27 July 1980) held numerous titles and honours, both during and before his time as Shah of Iran.

Royal titles and styles 
From his father's accession to the throne, on 15 December 1925, until his own accession, on 16 September 1941, Mohammad Reza held the style and title of His Imperial Highness The Crown Prince. Mohammad Reza deliberately chose to crown himself as Shah ('King'), rather than Shahanshah ('King of Kings'), pledging that he would not do so until he turned Iran into a prosperous and modernised nation. On the 26th year of his reign, in 1967, his imperial coronation ceremony took place and he was elevated to the title of Shahanshah.

On 15 September 1965, Mohammad Reza was granted the title of Aryamehr ('Light of the Aryans') by an extraordinary session of the joint Houses of Parliament.

Military ranks
 Imperial State of Iran
 19381938: Second Lieutenant, Imperial Iranian Army
 193816 September 1941: Captain, Imperial Iranian Army
 16 September 194121 July 1952: Commander-in-Chief of the Iranian Armed Forces
 19 August 195311 February 1979: Commander-in-Chief Iranian Armed Forces

Honours

National dynastic honours
Appointments

Decorations and medals

Foreign honours

References

External links 
O. James Younessi, Orders, Decorations, and Medals of the Empire of Iran – the Pahlavi Era

Mohammad Reza Pahlavi